In Sethian Gnosticism, Yao or Iao is an archon. In On the Origin of the World, he is one of the three sons of Yaldabaoth, with the other two being Astaphaios and Eloai. In the Apocryphon of John, he is the fourth of the seven archons.

See also
 Tetragrammaton
 Ἰαω

References

Gnostic deities